Bermuda Botanical Gardens features  of flowers, shrubs, and trees. The Botanical Gardens are in Paget Parish, Bermuda, a short drive from downtown Hamilton.

The Bermuda Botanical Gardens also includes Camden, the official residence of Bermuda's Premier, currently Mr. David Burt.

Botanical gardens in Bermuda
Paget Parish